Den store gavtyv is a 1956 Danish comedy film directed by Johan Jacobsen and starring Dirch Passer.

Cast
 Dirch Passer as K.M.M. Mathisen
 Ole Monty as S.P.R.F. Rodian
 Asbjørn Andersen as Forlægger Stenbæk
 Marguerite Viby as Else Jessen
 Preben Mahrt as Erik Jessen
 Bodil Miller as Anna Lise, Rodians niece
 Oscar Ljung as Kalle Karlfeldt
 Johannes Marott as Viggo Frederiksen
 Professor Tribini as Alfred Mogensen
 Gunnar Bigum as Tjener 'Stoffer'
 Henry Nielsen as Nattevagt
 Mogens Brandt as Bankkunde
 Kjeld Petersen as Værtshusgæst
 Hans Brenå as Akrobatdanseren
 Mogens Davidsen as Bartender Christiansen
 Paul Mourier as Juvelereren
 Jens Kjeldby as Bankkasseren
 Per Wiking
 Tao Michaëlis
 Holger Juul Hansen as Kriminalassistent Rønne
 Mimi Heinrich as Guldsmedens veninde
 Lisbeth Movin as Sekretær
 Alfred Wilken as Guldsmeden

External links

1956 films
1950s Danish-language films
1956 comedy films
Danish black-and-white films
Films directed by Johan Jacobsen
Danish comedy films